Solomiya Ivakhiv is a Ukrainian-born classical, internationally-performing violinist who holds a doctorate in musical arts and is an associate professor at the University of Connecticut as well as a professor of violin at the Longy School of Music of Bard College. In August 2021 she was awarded by presidential decree the title of Honored Artist of Ukraine by standing president Volodymyr Zelenskyy.

Biography 
Ivakhiv was born in the Ukraine to parents who both were in the field of education. At the age of two, Ivakhiv's mother identified early signs of innate musical understanding in her daughter and by six Ivakhiv was auditioning for the Special Music School for Children with Extraordinary Abilities in Lviv, Ukraine. It was here that Ivakhiv was introduced to the violin.

She would later receive her musical education from the Lviv Academy of Music before later graduating with honors from the Curtis Institute of Music, where she held the title of concert master of both Curtis Symphony Orchestra and the Tanglewood Music Center Orchestra and having studied with Joseph Silverstein, Pamela Frank and the late Rafael Druian. Following this she would earn her Master of Music degree from the M. Lysenko Music Academy in Lviv and complete her Doctorate in Musical Arts from Stony Brook University.

As well as being an accomplished international performing artist, Ivakhiv maintains a position of Associate Professor of Violin and Viola and Head of Strings. Ivakhiv has released four full length albums with the fourth and most recent being Poems and Rhapsodies, released by Centaur on February 11, 2022.

Musical career 
Ivakhiv has performed solo and chamber music at Carnegie Hall, Merkin Concert Hall, CBC Glenn Gould Studio, Curtis Institute Field Concert Hall, Italian Academy in New York City, Pickman Hall in Cambridge (MA), San Jose Chamber Music Society, Old First Concerts in San Francisco, Astoria Music Festival (Portland), Tchaikovsky Hall in Kyiv, Concertgebouw Mirror Hall, and at UConn’s Jorgensen Center for the Performing Arts.

She has made solo appearances with the Istanbul State Symphony, Charleston Symphony, Henderson Symphony, National Symphony Orchestra of Ukraine, Lviv Philharmonic Orchestra, the Hunan Symphony Orchestra in China, the AACC, and the Bach Festival Orchestra.

Featured appearances at chamber music festivals include Tanglewood, The Embassy Series in Washington, Emerson Quartet Festival, Newport Music Festival, Nevada Chamber Music Festival, Bach Festival of Philadelphia, The Banff Centre and Ottawa Chamberfest (Canada), Musique de Chambre à Giverny (France), Prussia Cove (England), Verbier Festival and Kammermusik Bodensee (Switzerland), AlpenKammerMusik (Austria), Modern Music “Contrasts,” and KyivFest (Ukraine).

Ivakhiv's music has had a global reach having been broadcast over three continents, multiple countries and dozens of radio stations including National Public Radio (America), The Grand 101 FM (Canada), Ukrainian National Radio and Television, and Chinese Hunan Television. Her latest record, Poems and Rhapsodies, released February 11, 2022 and has been broadcast on numerous state radio stations including NPR, and Sirius XF.

Teaching career 
Ivakhiv currently teaches at the University of Connecticut where she is the Assistant Professor of Violin and Viola and the Head of Strings as well as being a Professor of Violin at the Longy School of Music at Bard College.

Discography 
 Ukraine­ – Journey to Freedom.
 Mendelssohn Concertos. Brilliant Classics, rel. November 1, 2019
 Hayden + Hummel Concertos. Centaur, rel. April 17, 2020
 Poems & Rhapsodies. Centaur, rel. February 11, 2022

Awards and accolades 
In 2000 she placed second at the Sergei Prokofiev Competition and the following year was awarded the Honourable and Mrs. Peter H.B. Frelinghuysen Fellowship through the Tanglewood Music Center. In 2003 she won the Fritz Kreisler Gold Medal from the Curtis Institute of Music. In 2016 she was awarded both the University of Connecticut School of Fine arts New Scholar Award as well as the Silver Medal at the Global Music Awards for her album Ukraine: Journey of Freedom – A Century of Classical Music for Violin and Piano. In 2019 she was awarded the Alumni Excellence Award from the Curtis Institute of Music. In 2001 she was awarded the Merited Artist of Ukraine Award.

References 

American classical violinists
Ukrainian classical violinists
Year of birth missing (living people)
Living people